Navy Wife is a 1956 comedy film directed by Edward Bernds (who also directed "Three Stooges" and "Bowery Boys"), and starring Joan Bennett, Gary Merrill,  Shirley Yamaguchi. The screenplay was written by Kay Lenard, based on the novel Mother Sir by Tats Blain. The film was produced by Walter Wanger, who was Bennett's husband in real life.

Plot
This movie takes place in post-war Japan, where Peg Blain (Bennett) and daughter Debby (Judy Nugent) join Peg's commanding-officer husband Jack (Merrill). After the local Japanese wives see how independent and self-reliant Peg and Debby are, they demand to have the same respect, rights, and privileges as them. At a military Christmas party, the situation gets brought up and resolved.

See also
List of American films of 1956

References

External links 
 
 
 Navy Wife at Allmovie

1956 films
American black-and-white films
Films shot in Japan
Films set in Japan
Films based on American novels
Films directed by Edward Bernds
1956 comedy films
American comedy films
Films produced by Walter Wanger
Allied Artists films
Films scored by Hans J. Salter
Japan in non-Japanese culture
1950s English-language films
1950s American films
English-language comedy films